Renee Fitzgerald is a former camogie player, captain of the All Ireland Camogie Championship winning team in 1939, scoring four of Cork's six goals in the final.

Career
She won a further All Ireland senior medal in 1940, scoring two goals in Cork's 4-1 to 2–2 defeat of Galway. She scored a goal and had another controversially disallowed in Cork's 1942 All Ireland final draw against Dublin, before Cork lost the replay. She reportedly scored six goals in Cork's 11-4 to 1–0 defeat of Limerick in the 1942 Munster final.

References

External links
 Camogie.ie Official Camogie Association Website

Year of birth missing
Cork camogie players
Possibly living people